George Edward Arundell Monckton-Arundell, 6th Viscount Galway (1 March 1805 – 6 February 1876), was an Anglo-Irish Conservative politician.

Early life
George Edward Arundell Monckton-Arundell was born on 1 March 1805.  He was the son of William George Monckton-Arundell, 5th Viscount Galway.

Career
He succeeded his father in the viscountcy in 1834 but as this was an Irish peerage it did not entitle him to an automatic seat in the House of Lords.

He was instead elected to the House of Commons for East Retford in 1847, a seat he held until 1876 (the remainder of his life), and served as a Lord-in-waiting in 1852 in the first Conservative administration of the Earl of Derby.

Personal life
Lord Galway married his first cousin Henrietta Eliza, daughter of Robert Pemberton Milnes and sister of Richard Monckton Milnes, 1st Baron Houghton, in 1838. He died in February 1876, aged 70, at Serlby Hall, and was succeeded in the viscountcy by his son George. Lady Galway died in September 1891.

Notes

References
 Kidd, Charles, Williamson, David (editors). Debrett's Peerage and Baronetage (1990 edition). New York: St Martin's Press, 1990,

External links 
 

1805 births
1876 deaths
Viscounts in the Peerage of Ireland
Conservative Party (UK) MPs for English constituencies
UK MPs 1847–1852
UK MPs 1852–1857
UK MPs 1857–1859
UK MPs 1859–1865
UK MPs 1865–1868
UK MPs 1868–1874
UK MPs 1874–1880
Galway, V6